PLuS Alliance describes the educational cluster model formed by three academic research universities in different parts of the world, aiming to undertake cross-border research collaborations to tackle globally-important issues related to social justice, health, innovation and sustainability

The PLuS Alliance is a collaborative effort of three universities: King's College London, Arizona State University,  and the University of New South Wales. Together these three institutions comprise a body of over 15,000 staff, 150,000 students and more than one billion dollars in research funds.

External links
PLuS Alliance Website

See also
 King's College London
 Arizona State University
 University of New South Wales

References

International college and university associations and consortia